Mark Knowles and Daniel Nestor were the defending champions, but lost in semifinals to Jonas Björkman and Max Mirnyi.

Björkman and Mirnyi won the title, defeating Wayne Black and Kevin Ullyett 7–6(7–3), 6–2 in the final.

Seeds
All seeds received a bye into the second round.

Draw

Finals

Top half

Bottom half

External links
 Main Draw

Doubles